Santa Eulalia de la Dóriga is one of 28 parishes (administrative divisions) in Salas, a municipality within the province and autonomous community of Asturias, in northern Spain.

Villages
 Bárcena (Bárzana)
 Doriga 
 El Rubial 
 Fuejo (Fuexu) 
 Loreda (Llourea) 
 Marcel 
 Moratín 
 San Marcelo (Samarciellu)

References

Parishes in Salas